Patricia Dench (born 8 March 1932) is an Australian sport shooter. She won the bronze medal in the 25 m pistol in the 1984 Summer Olympics in Los Angeles.

Dench is regarded as Australia's first Olympic medallist in shooting. Previously Donald Mackintosh was considered the first, for his gold and bronze medals in pigeon shooting at the 1900 Paris Olympics. However, the International Olympic Committee (IOC) has since ruled that Mackintosh's events were non-Olympic.

She competed at the 1981 ISSF 10 meter air pistol, winning a silver medal.

References

1932 births
Living people
Australian female sport shooters
ISSF rifle shooters
Shooters at the 1984 Summer Olympics
Olympic shooters of Australia
Olympic medalists in shooting
Medalists at the 1984 Summer Olympics
Olympic bronze medalists for Australia
20th-century Australian women
21st-century Australian women